Erasmus Primary School is a school in Hawthorn, Victoria, a suburb of Melbourne, Australia, serving children from prep through year 6. It is founded by the Education Renaissance Trust, which is connected with the School of Economic Science, also known as the School of Philosophy.

Pedagogy 
Erasmus has a unique curriculum for an Australian primary school. The school incorporates meditation and mindfulness practices on a daily basis from early grade levels; in addition, the curriculum includes Latin and Sanskrit, the latter of which former headmaster Jonathan Tickner described as 'almost scientifically perfect'. The school also teaches once-a-week classes in philosophy and scripture, drawing from a mix of Eastern and Western philosophy, particularly relating to the Advaita Vedanta school. The school's website features quotes by Shantanand Saraswati, former head of the Jyotir Math Hindu monastery and pioneer of the Advaita movement. The unusual curriculum and pedagogy of Erasmus Primary School has received mention in the national media.

Statistics 
Erasmus is a small school, with 95 students enrolled in 2020. The school's NAPLAN results are above the national average; students in years 3 and 5 average 55 points above the national average in reading, 40 in writing, 48 in spelling, 58 in grammar, and 47 in numeracy.

Connection with the School of Economic Science 
Erasmus Primary School names Leon MacLaren of the School of Economic Science as its founder. Schools associated with the School of Economic Science have been the subject of child abuse scandals and cult accusations. Erasmus was discussed extensively in internet forums for former students of the London-based St James Independent Schools, another SES-related educational institution, regarding child abuse experienced by the former students and their families; this forum was later the topic of a private inquiry finding that children were "criminally assaulted" during their time at the St James and Vedast schools.

References 

Advaita Vedanta
Alternative education
Primary schools in Melbourne
Private primary schools in Melbourne
1996 establishments in Australia
Educational institutions established in 1996
Buildings and structures in the City of Boroondara